Gastrocopta iheringi is a species of very small air-breathing land snail, a terrestrial pulmonate gastropod mollusk in the family Vertiginidae.

The specific name iheringi is in honor of the zoologist Hermann von Ihering, who collected the type specimen.

Veitenheimer-Mendes & Oliveira redescribed the type material in 2012.

Distribution 
This species occurs in Brazil and Venezuela.

References

Vertiginidae
Gastropods described in 1900